Karen H. Grigoryan (born 25 February 1995) is an Armenian chess Grandmaster.

Chess career 

He was awarded the Grandmaster title in May 2013 during the Presidential Board Meeting in Baku. He was the Armenian U14 Champion (2008); European U16 Champion (2010), the winner of the G. Kasparyan Memorial – Young Masters 2010, the 2011 Youth Stars Tournament; the Armenian Chess Championship 2011, the Albena Open (2012), the Open Internacional Escacs Vila de Sitges in July 2013, the 2nd Yerevan Open (2017), the 9th Penang Open (2017), the Jolimark (HK) International Open Chess Championship (2017). In 2019, he won the 26th Elgoibar GM with a score of 7/9 points.

In June 2019, Grigoryan tied for first place with IM Aleksandr Ostrovskiy in the Charlotte Chess Center's Summer 2019 GM Norm Invitational held in Charlotte, North Carolina with a score of 6.0/9. 

In 2021, Grigoryan won the 46th Seville Open after tying for first place with Salvador Del Rio De Angelis with a score of 5.5/7, and winning the tiebreaks.

He is the third highest rated Armenian player

References

External links

Karen H. Grigoryan games at Chess-DB.com

1995 births
Living people
Sportspeople from Yerevan
Armenian chess players
Chess grandmasters
21st-century Armenian people